Exosome component 4, also known as EXOSC4, is a human gene, which is part of the exosome complex.

Interactions
Exosome component 4 has been shown to interact with Exosome component 2.

References

Further reading